Mirzaka is a district of Paktia Province, Afghanistan.  The estimated population in 2019 was 9,533.

References

Districts of Paktia Province